The 1984 PSA Men's Hamdard World Open Squash Championship is the men's edition of the 1984 World Open, which serves as the individual world championship for squash players. The event took place in Karachi in Pakistan from 28 November to 3 December 1984. Jahangir Khan won his fourth consecutive World Open title, defeating Qamar Zaman in the final.

Seeds

First round

Draw & Results

Note
Jahangir Khan took just 32 minutes to win the final watched by his father Roshan Khan, the 1957 British Open champion.
Event sponsored by Hamdard of Pakistan.

See also
PSA World Open

References

External links
World Squash History

World Squash Championships
1984 in squash
1984 in Pakistani sport
Squash tournaments in Pakistan
Sport in Karachi
International sports competitions hosted by Pakistan